Men's javelin throw events for blind & visually impaired athletes were held at the 2004 Summer Paralympics in the Athens Olympic Stadium. Events were held in three disability classes.

F11

The F11 event was won by Bil Marinkovic, representing .

27 Sept. 2004, 20:15

F12

The F12 event was won by Aliaksandr Tryputs, representing .

20 Sept. 2004, 20:00

F13

The F13 event was won by Chiang Chih Chung, representing .

23 Sept. 2004, 18:30

References

M